Naveena Vikramadityan ( Modern Vikramadithyan) is a 1940 Indian Tamil language film produced by N. S. Krishnan and directed by K. S. Mani. The film stars N. S. Krishnan, T. A. Mathuram, T. S. Durairaj and M. R. Swaminathan. The story is based on a 1933 American film Roman Scandals.

Plot
In the film, N. S. Krishnan used to give musical discourses on the story of King Vikramaditya, a legendary emperor of ancient India. NSK takes the emperor as his role model. One day he had a dispute with his friend M. R. Swaminathan who knocks NSK unconscious. During the unconscious state, NSK becomes the Emperor Vikramaditya. In this dream-like state he undergoes many adventures along with T. S. Durairaj. As a king he travels faster using roller skates. He meets Pesa Madanthai (woman who doesn't speaks) T. A. Mathuram and falls in love with her and sets about to make her his own.

Cast
List adapted from The Hindu article and from the database of Film News Anandan.

N. S. Krishnan
T. A. Mathuram
S. V. Sahasranamam
T. S. Durairaj
M. R. Swaminathan
P. S. Gnanam
T. S. Krishnaveni
P. R. Mangalam

Production
The film was produced in Central Studios where N. S. Krishnan had the office of his company Asoka Pictures. S. M. Sriramulu Naidu who was a partner in Central Studios helped in the production. Financial assistance was done by Narayanan and Company.

Roller Skates was not known in India at that time. N. S. Krishnan is said to have underwent rigorous practice for many hours in order to achieve perfection in the film.

Buddhimaan Balavaan Avaan
This a short film produced and directed by N. S. Krishnan. It featured N. S. Krishnan and T. A. Mathuram. This short film was shown along with the main film Naveena Vikramadityan.

Reception
The film was well received by the audience and is remembered for NSK's skating and its comedy.

References

Indian comedy films
Indian black-and-white films
1940 comedy films
1940 films
Films directed by K. S. Mani